Cheonhwangsan is a mountain in South Korea. It sits on the boundary between the city of Ulsan and the city of Miryang, in the province of Gyeongsangnam-do. It is part of the Yeongnam Alps mountain range.

See also
List of mountains in Korea

Notes

References

External links
 Official website for the Yeongnam Alps

Mountains of South Korea
Geography of Ulsan
Miryang
Mountains of South Gyeongsang Province
Mountains of Ulsan
One-thousanders of South Korea